The International Conference of Marxist–Leninist Parties and Organizations (ICMLPO) was an international grouping of political parties and organizations adhering to Mao Zedong Thought founded in 1998 by the Marxist-Leninist Party of Germany. It was organized by a Joint Coordination Group and met every two or three years. It ceased to exist in 2017.

It was known as the "International Conference of Marxist–Leninist Parties and Organizations (International Newsletter)" or as the "International Conference of Marxist-Leninist Parties and Organizations (Maoist)" to distinguish it from original International Conference of Marxist–Leninist Parties and Organizations (Unity & Struggle) that was founded in 1994 in Quito and continues to operate until today.

Participants at the 6th Conference (1999) 
 Marxist-Leninist Organization of Afghanistan (Afghanistan)
 Revolutionary Communist Party (Argentina)
 Workers Party of Bangladesh (Bangladesh)
 Organization from the Congo
 Communist Party (Marxist-Leninist) (Dominican Republic)
 Marxist–Leninist Communist Organization – Proletarian Way (France)
 Marxist-Leninist Party of Germany (Germany)
 A/synechia (Greece)
 CPI (ML) Janashakti (India)
 CPI (ML) New Democracy (India)
 Japanese Communist League (Japan)
 Communist Organization of Luxemburg (Luxembourg)
 Group of Marxist–Leninists/Red Dawn (Netherlands)
 Workers Communist Party (Norway)
 Revolutionary Popular Movement Paraguay-Pyahura (Paraguay)
 Institute Amaru (Peru)
 Communist Party of the Philippines (Philippines)
 Communist Party of Turkey/Marxist-Leninist (Turkey)
 Revolutionary Communist Party (Uruguay)
 Ray O. Light Group (United States)
 Organization from South-East Asia

Participants at the 7th Conference (2001) 
 Marxist–Leninist Organization of Afghanistan (Afghanistan)
 Revolutionary Communist Party (Argentina)
 Workers Party of Bangladesh (Bangladesh)
 Communist Party (Marxist-Leninist) of Bolivia (Bolivia)
 Colombian Communist Party – Maoist (Colombia)
 Revolutionary Organization from the Congo
 Communist Party (Marxist–Leninist) (Dominican Republic)
 Marxist–Leninist Communist Organization – Proletarian Way (France)
 Marxist-Leninist Party of Germany (Germany)
 A/synechia (Greece)
 CPI (ML) Janashakti (India)
 CPI (ML) New Democracy (India)
 Japanese Communist League (Japan)
 Communist Organization of Luxemburg (Luxembourg)
 Communist Party of Nepal (Mashal) (Nepal)
 Group of Marxist-Leninists/Red Dawn (Netherlands)
 Workers Communist Party (Norway)
 Communist Party (Marxist-Leninist) of Panama (Panama)
 Revolutionary Popular Movement Paraguay Pyahura (Paraguay)
 Communist Party of Peru (Marxist-Leninist) (Peru)
 Communist Party of the Philippines (Philippines)
 Communist Party of South Africa (Marxist-Leninist) (South Africa)
 Bolshevik Party (North Kurdistan – Turkey) (Turkey)
 Communist Party of Turkey/Marxist–Leninist (Turkey)
 Revolutionary Communist Party (Uruguay)
 Ray O. Light Group (United States)
 Revindo, Revolutionary organization from South-East Asia

Participants at the 8th Conference (2004) 
 Marxist–Leninist Organization of Afghanistan (Afghanistan)
 Revolutionary Communist Party (Argentina)
 Workers Party of Bangladesh (Bangladesh)
 Communist Party (Marxist-Leninist) of Bolivia (Bolivia)
 Colombian Communist Party – Maoist (Colombia)
 Revolutionary Organization from the Congo
 Communist Party (Marxist-Leninist) (Dominican Republic)
 Marxist-Leninist Communist Organization – Proletarian Way (France)
 Marxist-Leninist Party of Germany (Germany)
 Communist Organization of Greece (Greece)
 CPI (ML) Janashakti (India)
 CPI (ML) Red Flag (India)
 Provisional Central Committee, CPI (ML) (India)
 Committees to Support Resistance – for Communism (Italy)
 Communist Organization of Luxemburg (Luxembourg)
 Communist Party of Nepal (Unity Centre-Masal) (Nepal)
 Group of Marxist-Leninists/Red Dawn (Netherlands)
 Workers Communist Party (Norway)
 Communist Party (Marxist–Leninist) of Panama (Panama)
 Revolutionary Popular Movement Paraguay Pyahura (Paraguay)
 Communist Party of Peru (Marxist–Leninist) (Peru)
 Communist Party of the Philippines (Philippines)
 Party of Labour (Serbia and Montenegro)
 Communist Party of South Africa (Marxist-Leninist) (South Africa)
 Bolshevik Party (North Kurdistan-Turkey) (Turkey)
 Communist Party of Turkey/Marxist–Leninist (Turkey)
 Revolutionary Communist Party (Uruguay)
 Ray O. Light Group (United States)
 Revindo, Revolutionary organization from South-East Asia

Participants at the 9th Conference (2007) 
 Marxist-Leninist Organization of Afghanistan
 Revolutionary Communist Party of Argentina
 Workers Party of Bangladesh
 Communist Party (Marxist–Leninist–Maoist) of Bolivia
 Marxist–Leninist Party of Germany
 Marxist–Leninist Communist Organization – Proletarian Way, France
 Communist Organization of Greece
 Provisional Central Committee, Communist Party of India (Marxist–Leninist)
 Laborers’ Party of Iran
 Committee for the Support of Resistance – for Communism, Italy
 Colombian Communist Party – Maoist
 Revolutionary Organization of Congo, R.O. Congo
 Communist Organization of Luxembourg
 Group of Marxist–Leninists/Red Dawn, Netherlands
 Communist Party (Marxist–Leninist) of Panama
 Communist Party of Peru (Marxist–Leninist)
 Communist Party of the Philippines
 Party of Labour, Serbia
 Communist Party of South Africa (Marxist-Leninist)
 Communist Organization Southern Europe
 Communist Party of Turkey/Marxist–Leninist
 Bolshevik Party (North Kurdistan – Turkey)
 Revolutionary Communist Party of Uruguay
 Ray O. Light Group, USA
 Organization from South Asia

Participants at the 10th Conference (2011) 
 Revolutionary Communist Party (Argentina)
 Communist Party of Bangladesh (Bangladesh)
 Communist Party (Marxist–Leninist–Maoist) of Bolivia (Bolivia)
 Revolutionary Organization from the Congo
 Communist Party (Marxist–Leninist) (Dominican Republic)
 Marxist-Leninist Communist Organization – Proletarian Way (France)
 Marxist-Leninist Party of Germany (Germany)
 Provisional Central Committee, CPI(ML) (India)
 Laborers’ Party of Iran (Iran)
 Communist Organization of Luxemburg (Luxembourg)
 Group of Marxist-Leninists/Red Dawn (Netherlands)
 Communist Party (Marxist–Leninist) of Panama (Panama)
 Communist Party of the Philippines (Philippines)
 Bolshevik Party (North Kurdistan-Turkey) (Turkey)
 Communist Party of Turkey/Marxist–Leninist (Turkey)
 Revolutionary Communist Party (Uruguay)
 Revolutionary Organization of Labor (United States)

Final Activity International Seminar on 100 Years of October Revolution 
 Various Participants of the ICMLPO took part at this seminar in Gelsenkirchen/Germany organized by ICOR (International Coordination of Revolutionary Parties and Organisations) and ICMLPO.

See also 
 1980 International Conference of Marxist–Leninist Parties and Organisations

References

External links 
 ICMLPO

 
Anti-revisionist internationals
Left-wing internationals